Sir Thomas Lawley, 3rd Baronet (ca. 1650–1729) was an English politician who sat in the House of Commons from 1684 to 1689.

Lawley was the son of Sir Francis Lawley, 2nd Baronet and his wife Anne Whitmore, daughter of Sir Thomas Whitmore, 1st Baronet of Apley.

In 1685, Lawley was elected Member of Parliament for Wenlock and held the seat until 1689. He succeeded to the baronetcy on the death of his father in 1696.

Lawley married firstly Rebecca Winch, daughter of Sir Humphrey Winch, 1st Baronet, of Everton, Huntingdonshire and his wife Rebecca Browne and had fourteen children, eleven of whom died young. He married secondly Elizabeth Perkins, a widow and had a son and daughter. He was succeeded in the baronetcy by his only surviving son by his first wife, Robert. One of his two surviving daughters by his first marriage, Elizabeth, married as her second husband Sir Nicholas Lawes, Governor of Jamaica. Their descendants included Anne, Duchess of Cumberland and Strathearn.

References

1650s births
1729 deaths
Baronets in the Baronetage of England
English MPs 1685–1687